Pakistan has various religious minorities. According to the 1941 census of India, there were 5.9 million non-Muslims in the territories that came to form Pakistan in 1947 (West Pakistan and East Pakistan (now Bangladesh). During and after Pakistan's independence in 1947, about 5 million Hindus and Sikhs emigrated to India, with Punjab alone accounting for migration of 3.9 million people. According to the 1951 census conducted by the Government of Pakistan, Pakistan had 1.6% Hindu population. In East Pakistan (Bangladesh), the non-Muslims comprised 23.2% of the total population.

By 1997, the percentage of Hindus remained stable at 1.85% in Pakistan, while Bangladesh has witnessed a decline with Hindus migrating from it because of insecurity due to fear of persecution, conflict, communal violence (as a result of newly created Bangladesh's assertion of its Muslim identity) and poverty. The percentage of Hindus in Bangladesh had dropped to 9.2% by 2011, with non-Muslims accounting for 10.2%
of the population. due to disproportionate birth rates between the two communities.

Much of the decrease in minorities of Pakistan has occurred due to the events around the partition, the wars of 1965 and 1971. Forced conversions and marriages occur largely in rural and backward areas in Pakistan. November 2019, Pakistan formed parliamentary committee to stop the act of forced conversion in the country. However, according to "[t]he All Pakistan Hindu Panchayat (APHP)...[the] majority of cases of marriages between Hindu women and Muslim men were result of love affairs. It said due to honour, the family members of women concoct stories of abduction and forced conversions".

According to the Western religious freedom and human rights monitoring group Global Human Rights Defence, the US Commission on International Religious Freedom, and the United States Department of State, religious minorities face severe discrimination in Pakistan.

However in recent years,  Pakistan has seen development in safeguarding the rights of the minorities. For instance In 2019, Supreme Court of Pakistan gave verdict that Christians would be able to register their marriages with an official marriage certificate. In another case, Pakistan opened the Kartarpur Corridor, allowing Sikh pilgrims from around the world to visit Gurdwara Darbar Sahib, one of the holiest shrines in Sikhism, as a goodwill gesture towards minorities. Similarly, a judge nullified the "free-will" marriage of a Hindu girl, Mehik Kumari, and confirmed that she was underage when she "embraced" Islam and married a Muslim man. Activists had argued that Kumari was abducted and forcibly converted to Islam.

Following these events, Pakistan has given over 1 million non muslims the right to vote. The number rose to 4.43 million from 3.63 million since 2018.

Religious minorities

Demographics

As per 2017 census, Pakistan have a population of 207,684,000.

In 2012, according to the Government of Pakistan's National Database and Registration Authority (NADRA), the population of officially registered religious minorities in Pakistan was as follows:

Hindus: 1,414,527
Christians: 1,270,051
Ahmadis: 125,681
Baha'is: 33,734
Sikhs: 6,146
Parsis: 4,020
Buddhists: 1,492
Others: 66,898

According to the 1951 census conducted by the Government of Pakistan, West Pakistan had 1.6% Hindu population, while East Pakistan (now Bangladesh) had 22.05%.

According to the 1998 census conducted by the Government of Pakistan, Hindus made up 1.85% of the population and Christians (Protestant and Roman Catholic) 1.59%, or around 3.2million people. Other estimates put the numbers higher.  Historically, there was also a small contingent of Jews in Pakistan who emigrated to Israel in 1948.

The U.S. State Department's International Religious Freedom Report 2002 estimated the Shi'a population to be between 10 and 15%, of which between 550,000 and 600,000 are Ismailis, a sect of Shi'a Muslims and who pay tribute to their living spiritual leader, the Aga Khan.

In a 2011 book, Ishtiaq Ahmed wrote that "Some independent studies, however, suggest that the non-Muslims population of Pakistan is nearly 10 per cent and Hindus, Christians and Ahmadis make up four million each. It is generally noted that while majorities play down minority figures, the minorities inflate them. This is especially true of the Ahmadiyya community. Official statistics return less than 150,000 for them while the Ahmadis claim to be around ten million."

Much of the decrease in minorities of Pakistan has occurred due to the events around the partition, the wars of 1965 and 1971. In November 2019, Pakistan formed parliamentary committee to stop the act of forced conversion in the country.

In 1995, the Parsis put their number at 2,831.

Blasphemy law 

Pakistan's Blasphemy law stems from section 295-C of the Pakistan Penal Code (6 October 1860) XLV of 1860. It states that whoever "defiles the sacred name of the Holy Prophet Muhammad (peace be upon him) shall be punished with death, or imprisonment for life, and shall also be liable to fine." This law is phrased in vague terms (therefore violating the principle of legality), and is often used to level false accusations at people from religious minorities. Asia Bibi is a notable example of a person against whom such a violation occurred. Victims of these false accusations are often presumed guilty, and can be convicted without substantive evidence.

Independent human rights organisation Global Human Rights Defence receives a number of cases each month from the representatives of victims of the blasphemy law.

According to the 2012 United States Commission on International Religious Freedom (USCIRF) annual report, "The government of Pakistan continues to engage in and tolerate systematic, ongoing, and egregious violations of freedom of religion or belief." The USCIRF has designated Pakistan as "country of particular concern" since 2002. The report argues that "The country’s blasphemy laws, used predominantly in Punjab but also nationwide, target members of religious minority communities and dissenting Muslims and this frequently results in imprisonment. The USCIRF is aware of at least 16 individuals on death row and 20 more serving life sentences. The blasphemy law, along with anti-Ahmadi laws that effectively criminalise various practices of their faith, has created a climate of vigilante violence. Hindus have suffered from the climate of violence and hundreds have fled Pakistan for India."

Farahnaz Ispahani who was the media advisor to the President of Pakistan from 2008 to 2012, has blamed the successive Pakistani governments of pursuing a "slow genocide" against minorities to shore up their political base. A BBC FAQ notes that "Beginning in 1980, a slew of clauses was added to the chapter of religious offences in the Pakistan Penal Code. These clauses can be grouped into two categories - the anti-Ahmadi laws and the blasphemy laws." The BBC notes that there is widespread popular support for these laws in Pakistan, and that two prominent critics of these laws, Salman Taseer and Shahbaz Bhatti, have been assassinated in 2011. Regarding the blasphemy laws, the BBC observes that: "Hundreds of Christians are among the accused - at least 12 of them were given the death sentence for blaspheming against the Prophet."

Mass anti-Christian violence recently occurred in the 2009 Gojra riots and in the 2013 Joseph Colony riot and the 2013 Gujranwala riot. Recent anti-Shia violence includes the February 2012 Kohistan Shia Massacre, the August 2012 Mansehra Shia Massacre and the particularly deadly January 2013 and February 2013 Quetta bombings. The Ahmadiyya community in Pakistan was targeted in the similarly deadly May 2010 attacks on Ahmadi mosques in Lahore.

A survey carried out by All Pakistan Hindu Rights Movement Pakistan's revealed that out of 428 Hindu temples in Pakistan only around 20 survive today and they remain neglected by the Evacuee Trust Property Board which controls those while the rest had been converted for other uses since 1990. However, in November 2019, government of Pakistan started restoring process for 400 Hindu temples in Pakistan. After restoration, the temples will be reopened to Hindus in Pakistan.

Forced conversion 

The Human Rights Commission of Pakistan has reported that cases of forced conversion are increasing. A 2014 report by the Movement for Solidarity and Peace (MSP) says about 1,000 women in Pakistan are forcibly converted to Islam every year (700 Christian and 300 Hindu). However, an opposing view also exists and was recently documented in an interview published in The Times of India; "[t]he All Pakistan Hindu Panchayat (APHP)...[says the] majority of cases of marriages between Hindu women and Muslim men were result of love affairs. It said due to honour, the family members of women concoct stories of abduction and forced conversions".

Sikhs in Hangu district stated they were being pressured to convert to Islam by Yaqoob Khan, the assistant commissioner of Tall Tehsil, in December 2017. However, the Deputy Commissioner of Hangu Shahid Mehmood denied it occurred and claimed that Sikhs were offended during a conversation with Yaqub though it wasn't intentional.

Many Hindu girls living in Pakistan are kidnapped, forcibly converted and married to Muslims.  According to the National Commission of Justice and Peace and the Pakistan Hindu Council (PHC) around 1000 Christian and Hindu minority women are converted to Islam and then forcibly married off to their abductors or rapists. This practice is being reported increasingly in the districts of Tharparkar, Umerkot and Mirpur Khas in Sindh. According to another report from the Movement for Solidarity and Peace, about 1,000 non-Muslim girls are converted to Islam each year in Pakistan. According to the Amarnath Motumal, the vice chairperson of the Human Rights Commission of Pakistan, every month, an estimated 20 or more Hindu girls are abducted and converted, although exact figures are impossible to gather. In 2014 alone, 265 legal cases of forced conversion were reported mostly involving Hindu girls.

Within Pakistan, the southern province of Sindh had over 1,000 forced conversions of Christian and Hindu girls according to the annual report of the Human Rights Commission of Pakistan in 2018. According to victims' families and activists, Mian Abdul Haq, who is a local political and religious leader in Sindh, has been accused of being responsible for forced conversions of girls within the province.

Gallery

Hindu Temples

Gurdwaras

Churches

See also
 Demographics of Pakistan
 Languages of Pakistan
 Minority rights
 Hinduism in Pakistan
 Christianity in Pakistan
 Judaism in Pakistan
 Pakistan National Commission for Minorities
 Forced conversion of minority girls in Pakistan

References

External links
 Jews in Pakistan.  An article by Prof. Adil Najam of The Fletcher School of Law and Diplomacy, Tufts University.

Society of Pakistan
Ethnic groups in Pakistan
Persecution by Muslims